The 7th Armoured Brigade is an armoured brigade of the French Army. It carries on the traditions and honours of the 7th Armoured Division.

Organization 
The organisation of the brigade as of 2022 is:

 Headquarters and Staff, in Besançon
 7éme Compagnie de Commandement et de Transmissions – Command & Signals Company, in Besançon
 1st-2nd Chasseur Regiment – Armoured Regiment, in Thierville-sur-Meuse
 5éme Régiment de Dragons – Combined Armoured Regiment, in Mailly-le-Camp
 35éme Régiment d'Infanterie – Armoured Infantry, in Belfort
 152éme Régiment d'Infanterie – Armoured Infantry, in Colmar
 1ére Régiment de Tirailleurs – Armoured Infantry, in Epinal
 68éme Régiment d'Artillerie d'Afrique – Mobile Artillery, in La Valbonne
 3éme Régiment du Génie – Engineers, in Charleville-Mézières
 Le Centre de Formation Initiale des Militaires du Rang 7e Brigade Blindée – 3éme Régiment de Chasseurs d'Afrique, in Valdahon (Initial brigade training centre)

Notes

References
 Official site  - 7 BB

Brigades of France
Military units and formations established in 1999
1999 establishments in France